Fred Teasdell (born 5 February 1961) is an Australian former professional rugby league footballer who played in the 1980s.

Playing career
Teasdell played his junior rugby league with Forestville before being graded with Manly and made his first grade debut in Round 12 of 1980 against Penrith.  Teasdell played with Manly up until the end of 1982 but did not feature in any of the club's finals campaigns or grand final appearances.  In 1983, Teasdell joined arch rivals North Sydney.  In 1986, Teasdell got his one and only experience of finals football as Norths played against Balmain in the elimination final which the bears lost 14–7.  Teasdell played two more seasons with the club and retired at the end of 1988.  Teasdell went on to play in the lower grades of rugby league and captained the Newtown Jets in 1991.  Teasdell is the son of former North Sydney player Bill Teasdell.

References

North Sydney Bears players
Manly Warringah Sea Eagles players
Villefranche XIII Aveyron players
Rugby league hookers
Rugby league second-rows
1961 births
Rugby league players from Sydney
Living people